Al'Ula, sometimes stylized in English as AlUla, is an ancient oasis city located in Medina province of northwestern Saudi Arabia. Situated in the Hejaz, a region that features prominently in the history of Islam as well as several pre-Islamic Semitic civilizations, AlUla was a market city on the historic incense route that linked India and the Gulf to the Levant and Europe. 

The immediate vicinity contains a unique concentration of precious artifacts, including well-preserved ancient stone inscriptions that illustrate the development of the Arabic language, and a concentration of rock dwellings and tombs that date from the Nabataean and Dadanite periods that coincided with Greco-Roman influence during classical antiquity. Built more than 2,000 years ago by the Nabataeans, Hegra is often compared with its sister city of Petra, in Jordan. Meanwhile, the ancient walled city of Al'Ula ("Old Town"), situated near the Oasis that allowed for its settlement, contains a dense cluster of mud-brick and stone houses. AlUla was also the capital of the ancient Lihyanites (Dadanites). 

Today, the city of AlUla is within the Governorate of AlUla, one of seven constituent counties of Medina province. In addition to the ancient Old Town, a more recent historical city, displaying the settlement patterns of Arabic-Islamic urbanism, remains occupied. The area is also known for its striking landscape of rocks, canyons, and wadis, and the contrast between these dry surroundings and the lush, palm-filled oases near the city's center.

AlUla was once a key stop on the Hejaz Railway, linking Damascus to Medina. Today, the city is renowned for its wide array of tourist spots, from ancient heritage sites to natural landmarks. It also hosted various festivals, events, exhibitions, and concerts.

History
The walled city of Al'Ula was founded in the 6th century BC, an oasis in the desert valley, with fertile soil and plenty of water. It was located along Incense Road, the network of routes that facilitated the trading of spices, silk and other luxury items through the kingdom of Axum, Arabia, Egypt, and India. Al'Ula stands on the site of the Biblical city of Dadan but was founded with the ancient north Arabian kingdom of Lihyan, which ruled from the 5th to 2nd century BC. The older history of the Oasis has been divided into several phases. The Dadanite kingdom spans the seventh and sixth centuries BC. Dadan is mentioned in the Harran Inscriptions. In these it is told how Nabonidus the king of Babylonia made a military campaign to northern Arabia in 552 BC or somewhat later, conquering Tayma Dadan and Yathrib (Medina). It is thought that around the turn of the fifth century BC the kingdom became hereditary.

The next four hundred years, until around 100 BC, were the time of the Kingdom of Lihyan. The Nabataeans were the lords of the region at least until 106 AD when the Romans conquered their capital Petra. The Nabataeans made Hegra, their second capital.

It thrived from around 650 until it declined at some time before 1230. In the 13th century the old city of AlUla was built and many stones of the old Dadanite and Lihyanite ruins were reused. AlUla now became the major settlement of the region again until modern times. Between 1901 and 1908 the Ottomans built the Hejaz railway in order to link Damascus to Medina.

In the 20th century the new town centre was established beside the old town and eventually the people left the old buildings. The last family is said to have left in 1983, whilst the last service in the old mosque was held in 1985. Both the ruins of the Old Town and the site of the Liyhanite settlement now lie within the limits of the AlUla.

The most detailed study of the area was made by the French priests Antonin Jaussen and Raphaël Savignac, who visited the area three times, in 1907, 1908 and 1910.  They studied the remains at Hegra and Dadan and collected a large number of Lihyanite, Minaean, Thamudic and Nabataean inscriptions. Accordingly, it was their work that came to constitute the basis for all further study and research in the history of the area.

The first European traveller of modern times to describe the town was Charles Doughty in 1876. Charles Huber was in AlUla in 1881–82. He returned in 1883 accompanied by Julius Euting. In 1968 a team of archaeologists from the University of London investigated some fifteen inscriptions.

The vertical sandstone cliffs surrounding the valley provide ample surfaces for rock art, making the governorate one of the richer petroglyph regions in the Kingdom. Ar-Ruzeiqiah is a mountain in the southern part of the governorate, with a large petroglyph panel displaying hundreds of images, including depictions of hunting scenes with humans and a variety of animals. Ibex are the most common species but camels, horses and other species can also be found. Jabal Ikma also has a large façade with scenes, strange symbols, and inscriptions.

Cities, towns, villages 
There are four major municipalities in the Governorate of 'Ula: AlUla: the capital lying to the southwest (population 5,426); Mughīrāʾ to the southeast (population 8,952); Abu Raku, to the north (population 2,678); and Al Hajar to the northeast (population 1,707).

AlUla Old Town Village 
AlUla Old Town Village, also known as Ad-Deerah, is the traditional Arabian village to which people of the oasis moved some eight centuries ago and inhabited until the 20th century. It was built on a higher part of the valley in order to be clear of the floods that can occur during the rainy season. At its maximum expansion the town contained more than 1000 houses, which were built adjacent to one another, thereby forming a wall around the town to defend the population. On the west of the town, at the bottom of the cliff, is the old souq, which has been renovated.

Timeline 
Here is the sequence of historical events and the ancient evidence found in the AlUla governorate:

Royal Commission for AlUla 

The importance of AlUla as an archaeological and historic site led to the establishment of The Royal Commission for AlUla (RCU) in July 2017, the aim of which is to develop and promote AlUla as an international tourism destination. Moreover, the commission develops the plans for heritage conservation and preservation.

Development plan 
To promote tourism and gain more attraction, the Royal Commission on AlUla is training 200 young Saudis on an ambitious project where tourists will explore the area's cultural treasures. Recruited from the AlUla region, the 200 young people (all high-school age or in their first year as university students, and split 50-50 between boys and girls) are in Riyadh, Saudi Arabia being trained in hospitality, learning new languages, studying farming and water technology, and researching the cultural, social and natural history of their home region.

AlUla International Airport 
The AlUla International Airport was a crucial part of the development strategy of the Royal Commission for AlUla (RCU), which envisioned making it a global destination for culture and tourism. In March 2021, the airport was approved to receive international flights, along with an increased capacity of receiving 15 commercial flights at a time. The capacity was increased from 100,000 to 400,000 passengers per year.

Tourism 
AlUla has the potential to be one of the most important archaeological destinations for tourists from around the world. The Saudi Arabian government is collaborating with experts from around the world on the AlUla development. In April 2018 signed a 10-year deal with France that includes provisions for hotels, transport infrastructure and a world-class culture and art museum and since 2021, RCU has been running SME accelerator in colaboration with AstroLabs to ensure growth of the local tourism ecosystem. With this program, the region has set out on an ambitious mission to welcome 2M tourists and contribute SAR 120Bn to the national GDP by 2030. 

A major integrated archaeological survey of AlUla valley and beyond was launched by the commission, charged with protecting and regenerating the north-western region. While a conservation and development plan was established, some of the sites including the UNESCO World Heritage Site of Hegra were closed to the public but have been open since 2020 for visitors.

With the easing of the visa process for international travelers, AlUla attracts more tourists from abroad. Its most popular sites are the AlUla Old Town Village, which includes Old Town, AlJadidah Arts District and the Oasis, as well as Hegra, a UNESCO World Heritage Site, Dadan, Jabal Ikmah, Maraya, Elephant Rock, Harrat Viewpoint, and AlManshiyah Plaza. Travelers from around the world can also enjoy numerous activities such as stargazing, helicopter tours, UTV bugging, desert camping, hiking, biking, rock climbing, a Via Ferrata, Giant Swing and the AlUla Stairway and other adventures.

Accommodation in AlUla 
As the tourism infrastructure is still being developed in AlUla, finding an accommodation can be a challenge during high season. Tourists have a variety of options ranging from camping sites, holiday homes (appartments or chaltes at farms) to luxury glamping resorts.

Sharaan Resort 
A resort is planned to be built as early as 2020 and completed in 2023 in Sharaan area. The result will have residential neighbourhoods, a conference venue, a relaxing area and restaurants.

Winter at Tantora festival 
Every winter, the locals hold a traditional celebration to mark the start of the 40 day winter growing season. The name of the festival 'Winter at Tantora' is inspired by a sundial located in the Old Town of AlUla, which has been in use by the locals as a marker for the changing of the seasons.  On 20 December 2018, the first "Winter at Tantora" started with a series of different themed weekend events including music, arts, entertainment, and cultural events. The concerts were performed in Maraya Concert Hall, which was newly constructed for this purpose, and whose external walls are covered with mirrors, "Maraya" being the Arab word for "Mirrors". A second edition of Winter at Tantora Festival was held on 19 December 2019, and included performances by Omar Khairat, EBI "Ebrahim hamedi", Andrea Bocelli, Yanni, Enrique Iglesias and Lionel Richie.

Azimuth Festival 
As part of the “Winter at Tantora” festival, Saudi Arabia hosted a three-day festival of music, art and food. Held between 5–7 March 2020, the Azimuth Festival was an event that brought the east and west together at Al Ula. It marked performances from artists like The Chainsmokers, Jean-Michel Jarre, Tinie Tempah and others. The event took place at the beginning of the Covid-19 pandemic, and so received only little publicity.

Concert at Maraya 
Maraya is a mirrored building, which is located in the desert canyon of the Ashar Valley. Maraya is also a multi-purpose venue, which serves as the centerpiece of AlUla’s growing arts and entertainment scene while the structure itself is a work of art. From March 6 to March 7 2020, a large concert of Iranian singers was held at the winter celebration of the Kingdom of Saudi Arabia in the city of AlUla. Ebi, Leila Forouhar, Shahram Shabpareh, Shadmehr Aghili, Andy (Andranik Madadian), Arash and Sasy were present at the concert.

AlUla vision 
On 11 February 2019, Saudi Arabia's Crown Prince Mohammed bin Salman launched the AlUla vision which features a resort and nature reserve called Sharaan. The vision also includes the establishment of the Global Fund for the protection and revitalization of the Arabian Leopard.

See also 
 Sarat Mountains
 Hijaz Mountains
 Hijaz Railway
 The temple of Mahlab al-Naqa

References

Further reading 
 Abdul Rahman Ansary, Ḥusayn Abu Al-Ḥassān, The civilization of two cities: Al-ʻUlā & Madāʼin Sāliḥ, 2001,

External links 

 The Ultimate Traveler’s Guide To Al Ula, Saudi Arabia
 Al Ula and its ancient civilsations
 The Incense Road
 Arab Resorts Areas Company – Al Ula ARAC Hotel
 Uncovering secrets of mystery civilization in Saudi Arabia – BBC
 Experience Alula

Archaeological sites in Saudi Arabia
History of the Arabian Peninsula
Populated places in Medina Province (Saudi Arabia)
Oases of Saudi Arabia